The 1894 Villanova Wildcats football team represented Villanova University in the 1894 college football season. This was the first year in Villanova football's history and were led by head coach Mike Murphy. They finished the short season with a 1–0 record after defeating the Logan Athletic Association.

Schedule

References

Villanova
Villanova Wildcats football seasons
College football undefeated seasons
Villanova Wildcats football